Ismā’īl ibn ‘Alī, Abū Sahl al-Nawbakhtī  was the great scholar of the Imamah, and the uncle of Abu Muhammad al-Hasan ibn Musa al-Nawbakhti. Abū Sahl died in 923.

Life
Abū Sahl Ismā’īl ibn ‘Alī ibn Nawbakht was one of the great men of the Shi‘ah. Abū al-Ḥusayn al-Nāshī said that he was his teacher. He was a virtuous and learned theologian, who presided over a group of theologians. He had an idea about the qā’im of the family of Muḥammad which no one had before him. He used to say: “I say to you the [lawful] imam was Muḥammad ibn al-Ḥasan and, although he died hidden, there has arisen in the cause   during the concealment his son, and so will his son’s issue be concealed, until God consummates his dominion by causing him to appear.” Abū Ja‘far Muḥammad ibn ‘Alī al-Shalmaghānī, called Ibn Abī al-‘Azāqir (d. 934), summoned him to opposition, promising miracles and supernatural visions.  Abū Sahl had a bare spot on his forehead like baldness, so he sent the messenger with this reply: “I ask only one miracle of your master, that he should make hair grow on my forehead; then I can believe him.” The messenger did not return.

Al-Nadīm tells a very similar story about Al-Ḥusayn ibn Mansūr al-Hallāj who was in prison when he sent a messenger to appeal for Abū Sahl's help. However the reply came, “I am the head of a sect with thousands of followers, who will follow him if I follow him. So make hair grow on my forehead, for the hair there has disappeared. I want nothing else from him.” The messenger never returned to him.

Works
Al-Fihrist lists the following among his books:

The Fulfilment, about the imamate; Warning (Prophecy), about the imamate; Refutation of the Ghulāt; Refutation of Ṭāṭarī, concerning the imamate; Refutation of ‘Īsā ibn Abān, about legal interpretation;  Refutation of the Epistle of al-Shāfi‘ī; Ideas; Sessions; Knowledge; Confirmation of the Epistle (Confirmation of the Prophetic Mission); Refutation of Those Upholding the Attributes; Emergence of the World;  Refutation of Whoever Speaks of the Created [the Qur’an]; The Word, about man; The Vanity of Analogy;  Narrative and What Is Told; Refutation of the Book,  “Arousing Wisdom” (Ba‘th al-Ḥikmah), against Ibn al-Rāwandī; Refutation of “The Crown” (Al-Taj), against Ibn al-Rāwandī—it is known as Kitāb al-Shibk;   Refutation of Legal Interpretation by Personal Opinion, against [Ibn] al-Rāwandī; Attributes. Abū Sahl al-Nawbakhtī's brother surnamed Abū Ja‘far was a theologian of al-Nawbakhtī's doctrine.

Notes

References

Sources

9th-century births
923 deaths
Year of birth unknown
10th-century Muslim theologians
10th-century scholars
Scholars from the Abbasid Caliphate
Shia hadith scholars
9th-century Iranian writers
10th-century Iranian writers